The California was an automobile company located in San Francisco, California, from 1900–1902. It promised prices 100–300 dollars less than other auto companies. They also stated, in 1902, that "Our factory, where your machine is made, is at your disposal for any repairs or breakage. These can be attended to without the troublesome delays necessarily encountered when dealing with Eastern firms."

Models 
The California's main car was a runabout that ranged in price from $500–$3,000. It was tiller driven, and had an air-cooled, gasoline engine. The company also had electric and steam engines.

Demise 
On May 12, 1902, a fire destroyed the factory and all the machinery. This disaster ended the company forever.

Notes

Motor vehicle manufacturers based in California
Defunct motor vehicle manufacturers of the United States
Vehicle manufacturing companies established in 1900
Manufacturing companies based in San Francisco
1900 establishments in California
1902 disestablishments in California